Willemijn Verloop (Utrecht, 14 February 1970) is a Dutch peace activist dedicated to children affected by war, and also the founder of War Child In 2012, she founded Social Enterprise NL, a platform for growing the Social enterprise sector in The Netherlands. In 2013, she founded impact investment fund Rubio Impact Ventures.

Education and career 

Verloop grew up in Bilthoven and studied history and international relations at Leiden University and the University of Amsterdam. She went through short projects on the Political Affairs Department (Centre Against Apartheid) at the United Nations in New York and at the Political Affairs Department of the Council of Europe in Strasbourg. Then she worked for three years as a program manager at The European Action Council for Peace in the Balkans, a non-governmental organization that was committed to peace in the Balkans.

War Child Netherlands 

In 1994 Willemijn Verloop visited the war zone of Bosnia and Herzegovina and met an English professor of Music Therapy, Nigel Osborne, who gave creative workshops to children traumatized by war in the shelters of Sarajevo and Mostar. Excited by his activities she founded the Dutch War Child organization  in 1994 and started to engage politicians, musicians, artists and people from the media- and entertainment sector for the War Child cause. Under her leadership War Child Holland grew from a very small organisation in 1994 to one of the best known non-profit organisations in the Dutch market.

She personally took the initiative to develop War Child Holland's programmes in the field as relief organization focussed on bringing psycho-social aid for many traumatised children in war. This was at a time that  there were no organizations that were specifically focussed on war and children, nor on psychosocial aid. With War Child she was one of the founders and creators of Corporate Social Responsibility in the Netherlands by starting innovative partnerships and sponsorships with the commercial sector (a.o. Ben & Jerry's). From the mid-1990s she was seen as a frontrunner within the sector for low overheads and transparency in financial and operational reporting. Under her management War Child won the Dutch Transparency Award three times. What is stated in many interviews with her, is the innovative way the brand War Child was launched in the market, the business approach, low overhead, with innovative marketing, positive messages, catchy videos & clips, the use of music and entertainment industry as well as new spectacular fund-raising events such as the Friends for War Child concert. In her fifteen years as Director of War Child, she was a familiar guest in many television programs in which she stood up for human rights, culture and social development.

Since 1994 Willemijn Verloop co-produced many television documentaries about the problems in war zones. Many documentaries were made together with War Child ambassador Marco Borsato. From August 2007 she took on a different function as co-director, responsible for external relations and special projects. In the subsequent period she initiated several War Child media projects - among other things, she was the initiator and co-producer of the film The Silent Army that won the Un Certain Regard award at the Cannes Film Festival. In 2010 after 15 years directorship of War Child, the resigned to become the (unpaid) Vice Chairman of the Supervisory Board of War Child Holland.

Social Enterprise NL 

In 2012 Verloop became the director of the Dutch national platform for social entrepreneurs Social Enterprise NL, which she founded together with Mark Hillen. Social Enterprise NL aims to connect social enterprises, to enhance, grow and support the Social enterprise sector in the Netherlands. Social enterprises are businesses that primarily pursue a social purpose. By strengthening the sector, the overall social impact of these companies will be largely increased. According to a report by the NOS, there is a huge growth potential for Social Enterprises in the Netherlands.

In 2013 Verloop also started Rubio Impact Ventures, formerly known as Social Impact Ventures, together with Machteld Groothuis, an equity fund for Dutch social entrepreneurs  in which she is a partner.

Other functions 
Verloop is or was a board member of the ECCP (European Centre for Conflict Prevention), Stadsschouwburg Amsterdam, Eureko Achmea Foundation, Foundation for Child Soldier and Movies that Matter filmfestival, commissioner of the Amsterdam School of the Arts, Natuur & Milieu Foundation, Mundial Productions, Tony's Chocolonely, and V-Ventures. Besides that, she's the chairwoman of the Dutch National Advisory Board on Impact Investing. She also sits on various advice committees.

Awards
In 2003, she was awarded the Helene de Montigny-prize for "an immense contribution to combating the consequences of war and violence involving children in war-affected areas, the most innocent and vulnerable victims." This award was previously presented to Prince Bernhard and Max van der Stoel.
On 12 January 2007 she was bestowed with the high honour of Officer of the Order of Orange-Nassau for her "boundless commitment to peace and for her work for children affected by war". She received the honour from Mayor Cohen of Amsterdam on behalf of the Queen.
On 24 May 2008, on behalf of War Child Netherlands, she received the Roosevelt Institute award "Freedom from Fear" of the International Four Freedoms Award 2008, for her work helping millions of children in war zones.

Publications

 Opportunities for the Dutch Social enterprise Sector. Willemijn Verloop / McKinsey (2011) - Overview, challenges and support network for Dutch social enterprises
 Verbeter de wereld. Begin een bedrijf. Mark Hillen, Willemijn Verloop (2013), 
 Social Enterprise Unraveled. Mark Hillen, Willemijn Verloop (2014) - Best practice from the Netherlands,

References

1970 births
Living people
Officers of the Order of Orange-Nassau